Sarikei Division is one of the twelve administrative divisions in Sarawak, Malaysia.

Sarikei Division contains four administrative districts: Sarikei, Meradong, Julau and Pakan.

History and background
The early history of Sarikei can be traced as far back as the early 19th century. There are many historical events to show its existence. Rajah James Brooke first visited Sarikei on 30 April 1845. There was also resistance from the local people towards Brooke's administration, including the burning of Sarikei on 4 January 1856 and the Julau Expedition on 19 June 1856, which was led by Sir Charles Brooke to counter the native resistance in Julau.

The establishment of Sarikei as a new division was mainly based on security consideration. Datu Wilson Baya Dandot, the Deputy State Secretary (Planning and Development) in his article entitled "Sarawak’s Unique Administrative Identity: Establishment of Divisional, District and Sub-District Machinery For Enhancing Development Administration" said that the establishment of Sarikei as the Sixth Division then was due to the security threats posed by the communist insurgency which was at its height at that time. It was felt that with the establishment of a new Sarikei Division the government would be able to concentrate and focus more in its efforts to contain and counter the security problem in the area.

Residents Roll of Honor
 Chin Ting Ming
 Datuk Wan Hashim Bin Tuanku Taha
 Tuan Hj Adenan B Hj Aman
 Tuan Hj Mohd Iskandar B Abdullah
 Noel Hudson Laga
 Patrick Rigep Nuek
 Nilie Tangai
 Jolhi B Hj Saar
 Tuan Hj Mohd Atei Abang Medaan
 Liaw Soon Eng
 Sim Nyuk Foh
 Isaka Kana

Demographics 
The total population is 115,529. The population is ethnically mixed, with half of the population is Iban followed by Melanau, Malay, Bidayuh and Chinese predominating. The majority of the people live in Sarikei town.

Economy 
The economy of the division is mostly agricultural. Sarikei Division produces more pepper than any other divisions in Sarawak. It is also famous for fruits, especially pineapples and oranges. The timber industry, as elsewhere in Sarawak, is also a major component of the local economy.

Administration

Members of Parliament

Member of State Assembly

Transportation
Sarikei is the centre of the administrative division and it can be reached by land, water and air transportation via Sibu Airport.

Public transport

Own transport
One also can drive from Kuching to Sarikei (360 km/6 hours) or from Sibu to Sarikei (64 km/45 minutes).

See also
 Sarawak
 Sarikei

References

External links